Rivergaro is a comune (municipality) in the Province of Piacenza in the Italian region Emilia-Romagna, located about  northwest of Bologna and about  southwest of Piacenza.

Localities include Ancarano di Sopra, Fabbiano, Larzano, Rallio, Niviano, Ottavello, Pieve Dugliara, Rivergaro, Roveleto Landi, Suzzano, and Case Buschi.

The Medieval Castello di Montechiaro (castle of Montechiaro) is located in the locality of Rallio.

Rivergaro borders the following municipalities: Gazzola, Gossolengo, Podenzano, Travo, and Vigolzone.

Demographic evolution

References

External links
Comune di Rivergaro 

Cities and towns in Emilia-Romagna